Parkovy (masculine), Parkovaya (feminine), or Parkovoye (neuter) is the name of several rural localities in Russia:
Parkovy, Krasnodar Krai, a settlement in Tikhoretsky District of Krasnodar Krai
Parkovy, Vladimir Oblast, a selo in Yuryev-Polsky District of Vladimir Oblast